Tony Jay (2 February 1933 – 13 August 2006) was a British-American actor.

A former member of the Royal Shakespeare Company, he was known for his voice work in radio, animation, film, and video games. Jay was particularly noted for his distinctive baritone voice, which often led to him being cast in villainous roles. He was best known as the voice of Judge Claude Frollo in Disney's The Hunchback of Notre Dame (1996), Megabyte in ReBoot (1994–2001), Shere Khan in The Jungle Book 2 and the TV series TaleSpin (replacing George Sanders, who played the character in the original film), and the Elder God (plus various other roles) in the Legacy of Kain series of video games.

Jay also made many distinguished on-screen appearances, including the role of Nigel St John on Lois and Clark: The New Adventures of Superman (1993–1995). He further made guest appearances on programs including The Golden Girls in 1987, Twin Peaks in 1990–91, and Night Court in 1991. His most prominent onscreen role, however, is that of Professor Werner in Twins (1988), the father figure/mentor to Arnold Schwarzenegger's protagonist, Julius Benedict.

Early life
Jay was born in London. He attended Pinner County Grammar School, and completed his National Service with the Royal Air Force in 1953. He later recalled, "I was always an actor at school"; but opted for the financial security of a real estate business. Jay moved to South Africa in about 1966, after hearing of the potential there for his line of work. He left South Africa to return to England in 1973, after which he moved to the United States in 1986.

Career
While establishing his real estate business in England, Jay acted occasionally in amateur productions.

South Africa 
Within three months of relocating to South Africa at the age of 33, Jay found himself acting in radio dramas such as the detective series Sounds of Darkness where he played a savvy but blind FBI agent (1967–1972). The experience led him to decide to take acting up professionally.

Jay acted, wrote, and directed radio plays on the South African Broadcasting Corporation's first commercial radio station, Springbok Radio (1950–85). He was especially associated with the comic series Taxi! (1969–1972,1975–1978), in which he not only portrayed New York cabby Red Kowalski, but also co-wrote many scripts with Joe Stewardson. Other shows in which he was involved included Lux Radio Theatre, Playhouse 90, and Tuesday Theatre. Jay adapted, cast, and directed the first 6 months of episodes for The Avengers. The series, based on Seasons 4–6 of the 1960s British television series of the same name, was broadcast on Springbok from 6 December 1971 to 28 December 1973. To bridge the gap between the visual orientation of the British television series and the sound-only perspective of radio, Jay created a narrator which he embued with irony and scepticism.

Jay's voice work led him to do commercials for companies such as Gunston Cigarettes, Barclays Bank, and Bols Brandy.

United Kingdom 
After Jay's return to Britain in 1973 he worked in various television productions. For the BBC series Fall of Eagles (1974) he portrayed Tsar Alexander III of Russia, during which time he met Patrick Stewart, who played Vladimir Lenin. Jay appeared as the merchant in Shakespeare's Timon of Athens (1981) for BBC Shakespeare, and in single episodes of popular television programmes such as The Sweeney (1975), The Professionals (1978) and the comedy Whoops Apocalypse (1982).

During this period he was cast as Vladimir Maximovitch in Woody Allen's Love and Death (1975), which was shot in Hungary and France. George Lucas met with Jay about playing Obi-Wan Kenobi in a planned film with the working title Galactic Warfare. Despite Jay agreeing to the role, Lucas decided to cast Alec Guinness, instead.

On stage he had small roles in plays such as Anton Chekhov's The Three Sisters (1976) and Terence Rattigan's The Deep Blue Sea (1981). More important roles followed with an appearance as Jaggers in Great Expectations (1984) at the Old Vic, and as Shylock in The Merchant of Venice.

Jay was cast as Vincent Crummles in the Royal Shakespeare Company's -hour-long production of The Life and Adventures of Nicholas Nickleby (1986) at Stratford-upon-Avon.

United States 
After a tour of Britain, Nicholas Nickleby embarked on a limited tour of the United States, starting with performances in Los Angeles in June 1986, then on to Boston, Philadelphia, Washington, D.C. and New York City. "Even before I left England, I told friends I'd be staying if I got the chance," he recalled in a 1986 The New York Times interview.

During its run from August to October 1986 at the Broadhurst Theatre on Broadway, Jay's performance was described as "brilliantly played" by the New York Times. Consequently, he was nominated for the 1987 Drama Desk Award as Outstanding Featured Actor in a Play.

Jay's acting drew the attention of an agent who arranged for him to return from England to the United States for an audition. Jay was cast in a pilot program called Circus which was unsuccessful. On set Jay met make-up artist Kathy Rogers, who would become his second wife. He moved to the United States where he became a resident.

In addition, Jay won parts in television series such as Night Court (1991), The Golden Girls (1987), Twins (1988), and Eerie, Indiana (1991). Bigger roles included Paracelsus on the 1987 CBS TV series adaptation of Beauty and the Beast; Minister Campio on Star Trek: The Next Generation (1992); and Lex Luthor's villainous aide-de-camp Nigel St. John in Lois & Clark: The New Adventures of Superman (1993–95).

Jay's voice-over work included Monsieur D'Arque, the amoral asylum superintendent, in Disney's 1991 hit animated film version of Beauty and the Beast. From 1994 to 2001 he supplied the voice for the virus Megabyte in the computer animated television show ReBoot. According to one source, Jay was preferred to Patrick Stewart, Derek Jacobi and Ian McKellen for the voice of the main antagonist Judge Claude Frollo in Disney's 1996 animated film adaptation of The Hunchback of Notre Dame, directed by Gary Trousdale and Kirk Wise, who had also steered his performance in the film version of Beauty and the Beast. Jay reprised Frollo's voice for Walt Disney World's nighttime light and fireworks show Fantasmic! From 1995 to 1996 Jay was the voice of the alien warlord Lord Dregg, the villain during the last two seasons of the original 1987 Teenage Mutant Ninja Turtles animated TV series.

He is also well known among fans of the 1996–2003 video game series Legacy of Kain for his voicing of the original Mortanius and of the Elder God, alongside several other minor characters.

In various animated projects Jay took over the voice of Shere Khan, which actor George Sanders had originated for the 1967 Disney animated film The Jungle Book. In 11 episodes spanning 1990–91, Jay voiced Shere Khan for Disney's animated TV series TaleSpin, The Jungle Book: Rhythm and Groove videogame (2000), and the House of Mouse (2001–02). His final appearance as Khan came in the 2003 film The Jungle Book 2. His final role was voicing Spiderus in the Miss Spider series.

Jay was a devotee of classic Broadway and made several recordings and performances of old-time Broadway lyrics, in spoken-word form. A CD of these readings, Speaking of Broadway, was released in 2005; a version recorded in 1996 was entitled Poets on Broadway, as was his website. On it Jay recites lyrics written by the likes of Noël Coward, Ira Gershwin, and Oscar Hammerstein, accompanied by synthesized music which he composed.

Personal life
Jay began a relationship with Marta MacGeraghty in 1974. They had a son, born in 1989. They did not marry until 2004, and remained together until Jay's death in 2006.

Illness and death
In April 2006, Jay underwent surgery at Cedars-Sinai Medical Center in Los Angeles to remove a non-cancerous tumor from his lungs. Afterwards he became critically ill and was readmitted to Cedar Sinai, where he died on 13 August 2006, aged 73. He is buried in Forest Lawn Memorial Park in Los Angeles, California.

Filmography

Film

Television

Video games

Audiobooks and audio plays
Audiobooks:
2005: Time's Fool: A Mystery of Shakespeare by Leonard Tourney. Reader. Blackstone Audio.
2006: The Castle of Otranto by Horace Walpole. Reader. Blackstone Audio.

Audio plays:
1998: The Cabinet of Dr. Caligari, winner of the Independent Publishers Award. Blackstone Audio. Cast member.

Radio serials:
1967–1976: The Sound of Darkness. Writer, Actor (voice).
1968–1972: Squad Cars. Actor, Announcer (voice).
1969–1972: Taxi! Writer. Red Kowalski (voice).
1971–1972: The Avengers. Announcer (voice), writer, Director.

Commercials
Media
 Batman & Mr. Freeze: SubZero.
 The Dark Crystal.
 London Broadcasting Company – voice-overs for the station's main jingle packages between 1974 and 1980.

Food
 Golden Grahams Treats (General Mills snack bar).

Toys
 The Empire Strikes Back (Kenner Products toys).
 Disney's Hercules.
 ReBoot (Irwin Toy).
 Return of the Jedi (Kenner Products toys).

Video Games
 Dr. Mario.
 Kirby's Dream Land 2.
 Super Nintendo Entertainment System.
 X-Men 2: Clone Wars.

Accolades

References

External links 
 
 
 Tony Jay at Hollywood.com

 Special Springbok Radio Audio Tribute

1933 births
2006 deaths
Audiobook narrators
British expatriate male actors in the United States
Burials at Forest Lawn Memorial Park (Hollywood Hills)
English baritones
English expatriates in the United States
English male film actors
English male television actors
English male video game actors
English male voice actors
Deaths from lung cancer in California
Disney people
Hanna-Barbera people
Male actors from London
Royal Shakespeare Company members
20th-century English male actors
21st-century English male actors
20th-century English singers
21st-century English singers
20th-century British male singers
21st-century British male singers